A referendum on the prohibition of alcohol was held in Iceland on 21 October 1933. Voters were asked whether they approved of the ban on importing alcohol imposed following a 1908 referendum being lifted. It was approved by 57.7% of voters.

Results

See also
 Prohibition in Iceland

References

Referendums in Iceland
Prohibition referendums
1933 referendums
1933 in Iceland
Alcohol in Iceland
October 1933 events